Crim Rocks ( "little reef") is a small group of uninhabited islands in the Isles of Scilly, England, United Kingdom.

The Crim Rocks are the most westward of the archipelago's Western Rocks, therefore making them the westernmost point of England. The name may be cognate with the Middle Welsh "crimp" meaning "shin, ridge, or ledge." The most conspicuous of the Crim Rocks is the Peaked Rock. At least thirty ships are known to have been wrecked on the Crims.

See also

List of shipwrecks of the Isles of Scilly
List of extreme points of the United Kingdom

References

Uninhabited islands of the Isles of Scilly